Welcome To The Freakshow is a 2001 album by the Red Elvises.

Track listing 
Space Cowboy
Welcome to the Freakshow
A Kegga Beer and Potato Chips
Sex in Paradise
Million Miles
Cha-Cha-Cha
Running Away
Groovie
Show Is Over

All songs written by Igor (Gosha) Yuzov

Credits 

Igor: Vocals, guitars, bass, keyboards, percussion.
Andrei Baranov - drums
Mamoxa – trumpet
Jey Works – sax
Galiana Shlimovich – violin
Rouslan Valonen – keyboards
Back up vocals: Vladimir Goncharov, Nanduh Yuzov de Medeiros
Rouslan Valonen & Oleg Bernov recorded the tracks then Rouslan mixed
Recorded at Shoobah-Doobah Records in Venice, California, in December 2000
Photography by Theo Fridlizius
Package design by Christy A. Moeller-Masel

Red Elvises albums
2001 albums